Paul David Ware (7 November 1970 – 17 April 2013) was an English footballer who played in the Football League for Cardiff City, Macclesfield Town, Nuneaton Borough, Rochdale, Stockport County and Stoke City.

Ware began his career with local side Stoke City making his debut in 1987–88. He became a popular player amongst the Stoke support and scored the winning goal against Peterborough United to see Stoke through to the 1992 Football League Trophy Final where they beat Stockport County 1–0. Ware played a major role in 1992–93 which saw Stoke win the Second Division title before he was sold to Stockport County in September 1994. Ware then went on to play for Cardiff City, Hednesford Town, Macclesfield Town, Nuneaton Borough, and Rochdale before ending his playing career with a return to Hednesford. After his playing career had ended he battled against a brain tumour and he died on 17 April 2013 aged 42.

In 2018 a street was named in his honour on the Victoria Park housing development built on the former Stoke City Football Ground.

Career
Ware was born in Congleton and started his career in Stoke City's youth team before being handed a professional contract in 1987. He made his debut against Shrewsbury Town on the final day of the 1987–88 season. He played 15 times in 1988–89 scoring in a 1–0 victory away at Bournemouth. In 1989–90 Ware played in 19 matches as Stoke suffered relegation to the Third Division and the 1990–91 season saw Stoke finish in their lowest league position with Ware playing in 40 matches. Stoke's fortunes began to improve under new manager Lou Macari and Ware scored the winning goal against Peterborough United in the area final of the Football League Trophy sending Stoke through to play Stockport County at Wembley. Unfortunately for Ware, he missed the final due to injury as Stoke won 1–0. He played in 35 matches in 1992–93 as Stoke gained promotion back to the second tier.

He then joined Stockport County in September 1994 and spent three years at Edgeley Park which ended with him helping the club gain promotion in 1996–97. He spent time out on loan at Cardiff City and then spent two seasons at non-league Hednesford Town before joining Macclesfield Town. He then played on loan for Nuneaton Borough and ended his professional career with Rochdale before making a return to Hednesford Town.

Death
In 2012 Ware had an operation to remove a brain tumour. He died in the early morning on 17 April 2013 after his health deteriorated having previously been in remission.

As part of the redevelopment of the Former Victoria Ground, Victoria Park in Stoke has a street named in his honour.

Career statistics
Source:

A.  The "Other" column constitutes appearances and goals in the Football League Trophy and Full Members Cup.

Honours
 Stoke City
 Football League Division Two champions: 1992–93
 Football League Trophy winner: 1992

 Stockport County
 Football League Division Two runner-up: 1996–97

References

External links
 
 Paul Ware tribute in the Independent
 Paul Ware tribute at Draw For Me The Boothen
 

People from Congleton
English footballers
Stoke City F.C. players
Hednesford Town F.C. players
Rochdale A.F.C. players
Macclesfield Town F.C. players
Stockport County F.C. players
Cardiff City F.C. players
Nuneaton Borough F.C. players
English Football League players
1970 births
2013 deaths
Deaths from brain cancer in England
National League (English football) players
Sportspeople from Cheshire
Association football midfielders